Shirkieville is an unincorporated community in Fayette Township, Vigo County, in the U.S. state of Indiana. The community is part of the Terre Haute Metropolitan Statistical Area. Former state governor and U.S. Senator Evan Bayh was born here.

Geography

Notable people
Evan Bayh, former Governor and U.S. Senator of Indiana, born in Shirkieville

References

Unincorporated communities in Vigo County, Indiana
Unincorporated communities in Indiana
Terre Haute metropolitan area